Bobbitt–Rogers House and Tobacco Manufactory District is a historic plantation house and national historic district located near Wilton, Granville County, North Carolina.  The house was built about 1855, and is a two-story, three bay, center hall plan Greek Revival style frame I-house dwelling.  It has a full basement, full width front porch, and exterior brick chimneys.  Across from the house is the 2 1/2-story heavy timber frame tobacco manufactory.  Also on the property are the contributing wash house / striphouse, open wellhouse, smokehouse, privy, and flower house / chicken house.

It was listed on the National Register of Historic Places in 1988.

Images of home

References

Tobacco plantations in the United States
Tobacco buildings in the United States
Farms on the National Register of Historic Places in North Carolina
Historic districts on the National Register of Historic Places in North Carolina
Greek Revival houses in North Carolina
Houses completed in 1855
Houses in Granville County, North Carolina
National Register of Historic Places in Granville County, North Carolina